Chang Chenmo Kangri is a mountain peak located at  above sea level in the easternmost subrange of the Karakoram range in Ladakh, India.

Etymology
The name Chang Chenmo means "Great Northern" in Tibetic languages. Kangri means "snow mountain".

Location
The peak is located south-west of Tsogstsalu, a campsite and the location of an Indian border outpost on the banks of Chang Chenmo River.

References

Mountains of the Transhimalayas
Six-thousanders of the Transhimalayas
Mountains of Ladakh